William Vincent 'Vin' Evans (19 February 1935 – 14 August 2013) was an English cricketer.  Evans was a right-handed batsman who fielded as a wicket-keeper.  He was born in Stockton-on-Tees, County Durham.

Evans made a single appearance for Durham in a List A match against Sussex in the 1964 Gillette Cup.  In this match, he was dismissed for a duck by Tony Buss.  Durham were at the time a Minor county, but Evans didn't appear in any Minor counties cricket.

References

External links
Vin Evans at ESPNcricinfo
Vin Evans at CricketArchive

1935 births
2013 deaths
Cricketers from Stockton-on-Tees
English cricketers
Durham cricketers
Wicket-keepers